According to a 2014 study by Eastern Michigan University examining professional wrestlers who were active between 1985 and 2011, mortality rates for professional wrestlers are up to 2.9 times greater than the rate for men in the wider United States population. A 2014 report by John Moriarty of the University of Manchester and Benjamin Morris of FiveThirtyEight also found that the mortality rate for professional wrestlers was significantly higher than that of athletes in other sports. Experts suggest that a combination of the physical nature of the business, no off-season, and potentially high work load (with some wrestlers fighting more than 100 and even 200 matches per year), along with the drug culture in wrestling during the 1970s, 1980s, and early 1990s contributes to high mortality rates among wrestlers. Another study ascribes the higher death rate largely to higher rates of cardiovascular disease compared to the general population with morbidly obese wrestlers being especially at risk.

Many promotions employ performers as "independent contractors" and do not offer company-sponsored group health insurance coverage in most instances. This is said to have a causal connection to their longevity, morbidity and mortality. WWE performers' status as independent contractors was spotlighted by John Oliver on an episode of his show Last Week Tonight with John Oliver in March 2019, with Oliver calling on WWE fans to protest at WrestleMania 35. WWE denied Oliver's critique.

The concept of the untimely deaths of professional wrestlers was a frequent topic of discussion on the Opie & Anthony show. After Scott Hall's death in 2022, Bret Hart and Kevin Nash talked about the premature death of several wrestlers, mentioning the mental and body damage as possible causes.

List

Under 20

Under 30

Under 40

Under 50

Under 60

Under 65

See also
 List of oldest surviving professional wrestlers
 List of professional wrestling memorial shows
 Ten-bell salute
 Tributes: Remembering Some of the World's Greatest Wrestlers, a book featuring eulogies for professional wrestlers

References

Further reading

Professional wrestling, Premature
History of professional wrestling
Professional wrestling controversies

Professional wrestling-related lists
Premature events